George Frederick Appleton,  (20 February 1902 – 28 August 1993) was an Anglican bishop in the third quarter of the twentieth century and a writer.

Life
Born in Windsor, Berkshire to Thomas George Appleton and Lily Cock, Appleton was educated at Selwyn College, Cambridge, where he gained his B.A. in 1924, followed by his M.A. in 1929. Meanwhile, he trained at St Augustine's College, Canterbury, subsequently he was ordained a deacon in 1925 and a priest at St Dunstan's, Stepney, the Stepney parish church, in 1926.

After the curacy, Appleton spent the next 20 years in Burma as a SPG missionary, ending this part of his ministry as Archdeacon of Rangoon before returning to England. He was next vicar of Headstone then rector of St Botolph's Aldgate.

He described the war-time experience of the Anglican Church in Burma in a 1946 booklet for SPG, The War and After: Burma. Before the Europeans left Burma in the face of the invading Japanese, Appleton put into place plans for Holy Communion once stores of wafers and wine had run out: local congregations would use boiled rice and tea or water or coconut milk as the elements.

In 1962, he became Archdeacon of London and a canon of St Paul's Cathedral and a year later Anglican Archbishop of Perth, Australia. In 1969 he was translated to Jerusalem. He retired in 1974, and thereafter served as Assistant Curate at St Michael, Cornhill in the Diocese of London.

A prominent writer, he was awarded the Buber-Rosenzweig Medal by the Council of Christians and Jews in 1975.

Personal life
Appleton was married to Marjorie (Madge) in Holy Trinity Cathedral, Yangon (then Rangoon) in 1929. The couple had three children, Margaret, Timothy and Rachel. His wife died on 16 April 1980. He died on 28 August 1993.

Works
 Glad Encounter. SPCK Publishing, 1978. 
 Daily prayer and praise. Westminster Press, 1978. .
 Glimpses of Faith. Mowbray, 1982. 
 Prayers from a Troubled Heart. Fortress Pr, 1983. .
 
 Entry into Life: Gospel Of Death. Darton, Longman Todd, 1985. 
 The Heart of the Bible. HarperCollins, 1986. 
 Journey for a Soul. 1986, ASIN B000S5KMS2.
 Jerusalem Prayers for the World Today. SPCK Publishing, 1986. .
 Understanding The Psalms. Continuum International Pub., 1988. .
 
 Unfinished: George Appleton Remembers and Reflects. HarperCollins, 1990. .
  (first published by OUP 1985 )

References

External links
 

1902 births
1993 deaths
20th-century Anglican archbishops
Alumni of Selwyn College, Cambridge
Archdeacons of London
Archdeacons of Rangoon
Anglican archbishops of Perth
Anglican bishops of Jerusalem
British Christian writers
Companions of the Order of St Michael and St George
Members of the Order of the British Empire
Anglican writers
People from Windsor, Berkshire
Burmese Anglicans